Sinnott is a surname. Notable people with the surname include:

Arts and entertainment
 Declan Sinnott (born 1950), Irish-born musician and producer
 Joe Sinnott (1926–2020), American comic book artist
 Kevin Sinnott (born 1947), Welsh painter 
 Lillian Sinnott (1890–1914), American actress
 Mack Sennett (born Michael Sinnott) (1880–1960), actor, director and producer 
 Paul Sinnott, English drummer
 Richard Sinnott (born 1963), English actor 
 Will Sinnott (1960–1991), Scottish musician and songwriter

Politics
 Edward Sinnott (1864–1936), Newfoundland politician 
 Herbert Arthur Sinnott (1871–?), 21st mayor of Calgary, Alberta
 John Sinnott (politician) (1905–1960), Liberal Party of Canada member of parliament 
 Joseph E. Sinnott (born c. 1966), mayor of Erie, Pennsylvania
 Kathy Sinnott (born 1950), Irish disability rights campaigner and politician
 Nicholas J. Sinnott (1870–1929), US Representative from Oregon
 Sir Hilary Nicholas Hugh Synnott KCMG (20 March 1945 – 8 September 2011) was a British diplomat who was Regional Coordinator of the Coalition Provisional Authority (CPA) in Southern Iraq from 2003 to 2004, before retiring in 2005. He published a book about his time there called 'Bad Days In Basra'.

Science
 Edmund Ware Sinnott (1888–1968), American botanist and author
 Rick Sinnott, Anchorage, Alaska biologist

Sport
 Conor Sinnott (born 1986), Irish footballer
 Garrett Sinnott (born 1987), Irish hurler
 Gerry Sinnott (born 1951), Irish equestrian
 Jordan Sinnott (1994–2020), English footballer
 Lee Sinnott (born 1965), Irish football player and manager
 Nicola Sinnott (born 1987), Irish footballer 
 Stellah Sinnott (born 1962), camogie manager
 Todd Sinnott (born 1992), Australian  golfer

Other
 John Sinnott (1829–1896), Irish recipient of the Victoria Cross
 Joseph F. Sinnott (1837–1906), Irish businessman who emigrated to Pennsylvania
 Steve Sinnott (1951–2008), British trade unionist 
 William Sinnott (1886–1965), American detective and Congressional Gold Medal recipient
 Admiral Sir Anthony Monckton Synnot KBE AO RAN (5 January 1922 – 4 July 2001) senior officer in the Royal Australian Navy, between 1979 and 1982 Chief of the Defence Force Staff.

See also
 Sinnott Township, Minnesota

Welsh-language surnames